Lachixío may refer to:
Lachixío Zapotec, Zapotec language of Oaxaca, Mexico
San Vicente Lachixío, town and municipality in Oaxaca 
Santa María Lachixío, town and municipality in Oaxaca